"The One with the Girl Who Hits Joey" is the fifteenth episode of Friends fifth season, and the 112th overall. It first aired on the NBC network in the United States on February 18, 1999.

In this episode, Joey (Matt LeBlanc) struggles in his relationship with over-physical girlfriend Katie (Soleil Moon Frye). Chandler (Matthew Perry) becomes insecure about his relationship with Monica (Courteney Cox) when their friends joke about long-term relationships, and Ross (David Schwimmer) struggles to fit in with the tenants in his apartment, no thanks to the efforts of Phoebe (Lisa Kudrow).

Plot
Having discovered about Monica and Chandler by seeing them having sex from the window of his new apartment, Ross confronts them. He is initially furious at Chandler, mistakenly thinking the latter is taking advantage of his sister, but when he realizes that the two are in love, his anger at them vanishes on the spot. Since he is the last of the group to discover the relationship, Chandler and Monica do not have to hide anything anymore, and they quickly become a much-discussed subject of talks in the group. Chandler starts to freak out about the relationship when his friends start to make long-term-relationship jokes, such as he and Monica having kids and having Ross as brother-in-law. His concerns are amplified when Rachel asks him to consider the fact that Monica does want to get married someday and that she broke up with Richard when she found out that he did not want any more children.

When Chandler talks to Monica about all the jokes the friends have kept making, he reacts immaturely by trying to pass off their relationship as "casual". Monica gets angry with him and storms out, avoiding him when the two get within talking range. When he insists to talk to her, she tells him to start figuring out how to solve relationship problems himself. Now in a desperate situation, Chandler tries to make up with her by taking Ross and Joey's advice of making a big gesture. What he manages to do, however, is screwed up again – this time in a good but very unnatural sense – by proposing to Monica in front of everyone just to say sorry. Monica calms Chandler down by telling him that he does not have to worry about marriage with her and he is clearly not ready to solve relationship problems by himself.

The friends also get to meet Joey's new girlfriend, Katie, who is very nice and energetic – so energetic, in fact, that she playfully punches Joey, who does not appreciate this because she is rather strong and keeps accidentally hurting his arm, but she thinks he is only joking when he tells her this. When he decides to break up with her, he wears six sweaters on top of each other to cushion the punches, but Rachel saves him the trouble of transforming into a punchbag when, after Katie playfully punches her a few times and accidentally hurts her also, she retaliates by angrily kicking Katie's ankle, hurting Katie, who is furious and demands that Joey stick up for her. He refuses, however, hoping that she will consequently break up with him – which she does, without touching him, much to his delight.

At his new apartment, Ross receives a visit from Phoebe with an assortment of house-warming gifts. At the same time, the president of the tenants committee, Steve, greets Ross and tells him of Howard, the retiring handyman and a party they are throwing for him. When Ross reasonably refuses to contribute $100 for the handyman he has never even met, Steve thinks that Ross is a cheapskate. He vilifies Ross as this to everyone in the apartment block, causing everyone in the building to hate Ross. Annoyed by this, he tries to organize a party for everyone to explain the reason behind the refusal, but is interrupted by the party everyone is having for Howard next door. He is even more surprised to find Phoebe there, especially when he finds out that she paid the $100 and that everyone likes her. Things get even worse for him when he cuts and eats Howard's cake. Just as he is about to be kicked out of the party, Phoebe jumps in to defend Ross, but ends up criticizing and insulting her new friends, who kick her and Ross out of the party.

In the epilogue, the group makes jokes about how Chandler apologized by proposing, and Monica says they will be doing that for a long time based on how insane his actions were. However, Ross then ruins it by doing it on Rachel with the "We were on a break" thing, resulting in the group walking out on him.

External links

Friends (season 5) episodes
1999 American television episodes